Kinzebulatovo (Kinyäbulat) is a rural locality (a village) and the administrative centre of Bayguzinsky Selsoviet, Ishimbaysky District, Bashkortostan, Russia. The population was 1,058 as of 2010. There are 23 streets.

Geography 
Kinzebulatovo is located 15 km southeast of Ishimbay (the district's administrative centre) by road. Bayguzino is the nearest rural locality.

References 

Rural localities in Ishimbaysky District